M109 is a self-propelled 155 mm howitzer.

M109 may also mean:

 M109 shop van (truck), a variant of a M35 2½ ton cargo truck
 HMS Bangor (M109), a minehunter  of Sandown-class 
 M-109 highway (Michigan), a state highway in Michigan
 Messier 109 (M109), a spiral galaxy in the constellation Ursa Major
 Messerschmitt Bf 109, a German World War 2 fighter aircraft.
 Barrett XM-109, an anti-materiel weapon
 Suzuki Boulevard M109R, a motorcycle